SV Wehen Wiesbaden II was a German association football club based in Wiesbaden, Germany. It was the reserve team of SV Wehen Wiesbaden.

History
SV Wehen Wiesbaden II were the reserve and under–23 team to 3. Liga side, SV Wehen Wiesbaden. The played at what used to be SV Wehen's old ground before they moved to Wiesbaden, Stadion am Halberg. They last play in the Hessenliga after finishing 16th in the Regionalliga Süd in 2011.

The team had been a member of the Landesliga Hessen-Mitte from 1992 to 2007, when it won a league championship and gained entry to the Oberliga Hessen. After finishing runners-up in this league the following year, the team was promoted to the Regionalliga Süd. It lasted for three seasons in this league before being relegated back to Hesse's highest league, now called the Hessenliga.

The club announced that it would withdraw its reserve team at the end of the 2014–15 season.

Honours
The club's honours:
 Oberliga Hessen
 Runners-up: 2008
 Landesliga Hessen-Mitte
 Champions: 2007
 Runners-up: 2002

Recent managers
Recent managers of the club:

Recent seasons
The recent season-by-season performance of the club:

With the introduction of the Regionalligas in 1994 and the 3. Liga in 2008 as the new third tier, below the 2. Bundesliga, all leagues below dropped one tier. Alongside the introduction of the 3. Liga in 2008, a number of football leagues in Hesse were renamed, with the Oberliga Hessen renamed to Hessenliga, the Landesliga to Verbandsliga, the Bezirksoberliga to Gruppenliga and the Bezirksliga to Kreisoberliga.

Key

References

External links
 Official site
 SV Wehen Wiesbaden II at Weltfussball.de 
 Das deutsche Fußball-Archiv  historical German domestic league tables

German reserve football teams
Hessian reserve football teams
SV Wehen Wiesbaden